Sweet Robots Against the Machine is the eponymous debut album by Sweet Robots Against the Machine, a pseudonym for Japanese music producer Towa Tei, released on February 10, 1997 by East West Records. It includes a cover version of Patrice Rushen's "Forget Me Nots".

Track listing

Charts

References

External links
 

1997 albums
Towa Tei albums
East West Records albums